is a 2021 Japanese anime film based on the novel of the same name by Kanako Nishi. It was produced by Studio 4°C and directed by Ayumu Watanabe. It was originally released in Japan in June 2021.

Cast

Production
The film was first announced in January 2021. It was produced by Studio 4°C and directed by Ayumu Watanabe, with Satomi Ooshima writing the scripts and Kenichi Konishi designing the characters. The film's main theme is "Image no Uta", performed by Kurumi Inagaki, and the end theme is "Taketen", performed by Greeeen.

Release
The film was theatrically released in Japan on June 11, 2021. Internationally, it was licensed by GKIDS in North America, who screened the film in theaters in the region on June 3, 2022. It was released on DVD and Blu-Ray on July 19, 2022.

Reception
Kim Morrissy from Anime News Network praised the film's animation and "true-to-life" story but criticized the characterization of the titular character.

Fortune Favors Lady Nikuko grossed $1,706,970 at the box office.

Accolades

References

External links
  
 

2021 anime films
Anime films based on novels
Films directed by Ayumu Watanabe
Films set on boats
2020s Japanese-language films
Studio 4°C